Francis Bradley may refer to:

 F. H. Bradley (Francis Herbert Bradley, 1846–1924), British philosopher
 Francis Wright Bradley (1884–1971), American educator, academic
 Francis J. Bradley (1926–2021), American health physicist and writer

See also
Frank Bradley (disambiguation)
Francis Bradley-Birt (1874–1963), British diplomat and writer